Burj is a village and Indus Valley civilization archaeological site in the Fatehabad district of the Indian state of Haryana.

References

Villages in Fatehabad district